LAE may refer to:
 Local area emergency, by Specific Area Message Encoding
 Least absolute errors, an alternate name for least absolute deviations in statistics
 Loterías y Apuestas del Estado, Spanish lottery
 Popular Unity (Greece) (Laïkí Enótita), a left-wing political party in Greece
 Lae, the capital of Morobe Province and the second-largest city in Papua New Guinea
 Lae Atoll, atoll in the Marshall Islands
 HMAS Lae, two Australian warships
 LAE-32 (D-Lysergic acid ethylamide), a derivative of ergine
 Lae language, also known as Aribwatsa, an extinct member of the Busu subgroup of Lower Markham languages in the area of Lae, Morobe Province, Papua New Guinea
 Left atrial enlargement, enlargement of the left atrium (LA) of the heart and a form of cardiomegaly

See also